Brandon Malik Parker (born October 21, 1995) is an American football offensive tackle for the Las Vegas Raiders of the National Football League (NFL). He played college football at North Carolina A&T before being selected by the Raiders in the third round of the 2018 NFL Draft.

Early life
Parker was born in Kannapolis, North Carolina, to George Curtis Parker III and his wife Regina. Both of his parents have athletic backgrounds. Parker attended A.L. Brown High School, in Kannapolis, North Carolina where he started two of the three years he played varsity football. During his senior year, Parker led the Wonders to an 8–4 record. During Parker's high school career, the wonders  averaged 287 yards rushing per game and completed 62.4 percent of its passes.

College career
Parker's tall and lanky frame was a point of concern and limited the number of schools interested in recruiting him for football. In an interview with Brian McLaughlin of Herosports.com, Parker said "I really wasn't highly sought after coming out of high school, because of my frame, and I didn't have really good film my junior year; My senior year, I didn't really get any kind of accolades. You had to come to my school to know anything about me. I was a much slimmer guy, if you can believe that...With schools like Alabama and Clemson, they're looking for the guy who is ready to go right now." Parker received full scholarship offers from Division II Winston-Salem state, FCS North Carolina A&T, North Carolina Central; a partial scholarship from his father's alma mater North Carolina; & preferred walk-on spots from then FCS Appalachian State, Charlotte, & FBS Duke. He would then sign with North Carolina A&T as one of their 22 signees recruited under Head Coach Rod Broadway.

2014 season

Parker was redshirted during the 2013 football season. In 2014, he  was projected to be second on the Aggies depth chart at the left tackle position behind William Robinson. When Robinson went down with an injury, Parker was placed as starter. Parker started in all 12 games played that season, having standout performances against Florida A&M and Morgan State. Parker would conclude the season earning third-team All-MEAC honors. His contributions to the team resulted in Quarterback Kwashaun Quick having his best passing season of his career, as Parker prevented Quick from being sacked.

2015 season

Parker, who started for all 12 games of the season had impressive showings against Florida A&M and at the Celebration Bowl against Alcorn State. Parker averaged 4 pancake blocks per game while successfully never surrendering a sack from his position at left tackle. Parker's style of play led to only 2 penalties called against him in 2015, which contributed to the Aggies being 2nd in the MEAC in offense. Parker finished his season with a number of accolades, including All-American honors from both American Urban Radio Networks and Boxtorow. Parker was also named the MEAC Offensive Lineman of the Year, becoming the second player in the program's history to win the award behind Qasim Mitchell who won in 2001.

2016 season

Parker started all 12 games of the 2016 football season, earning MEAC offensive lineman of the week a total of five times. Parker was involved in 779 gradable plays during the 2016 football season including: 48 total knockdowns with an average 87% grade. Parker also graded out higher than 90% on 5 occasions, contributing to A&T being rated 1st in total offense and rushing offense; and 3rd in passing offense in the MEAC. At the conclusion of the season, Parker was named to the All-MEAC first team and awarded the conference's Offensive lineman of the year award for the second consecutive season. In addition to his conference honors, he was named an FCS second team All-American by the Associated Press.

2017 season

Parker entered his final season with A&T as the starting left tackle for all 12 games of the 2017 season. Parker's stingy blocking resulted in 0 sacks by his opponents, resulting in him never allowing a single sack in his entire collegiate career. Parker was awarded the MEAC Offensive Lineman of the Year award, becoming the first player to win the award in 3 consecutive seasons. His performance also earned him 1st team FCS All-America honors and an invite to the Senior Bowl.

Professional career
On November 20, 2017, it was announced that Parker had accepted his invitation to play in the 2018 Senior Bowl. On January 27, 2018, Parker played in the 2018 Reese's Senior Bowl as part of Houston Texans head coach Bill O'Brien's South team who defeated the North 45–16. His overall performance at the Senior Bowl impressed scouts and team representatives and helped raise his draft stock. Parker was among 20 Football Championship Subdivision (FCS) players who received an invitation to attend the NFL Scouting Combine.
Parker attended the NFL Scouting Combine in Indianapolis and completed the majority of combine drills, but opted to skip the bench press. His overall combine performance was considered fair among scouts as he finished third among all offensive linemen in the broad jump and ninth in the vertical jump.

Parker attended pre-draft visits and private workouts with multiple teams including the San Diego Chargers, Cincinnati Bengals, Philadelphia Eagles, New Orleans Saints, Buffalo Bills, New York Giants and Carolina Panthers. On April 2, 2018, Parker participated at North Carolina A&T's pro day and chose to perform the 40-yard dash (5.42s), 20-yard dash (3.08s), 10-yard dash (1.78s), and bench press (21 reps). At the conclusion of the pre-draft process, Parker was projected to be a fourth or fifth round pick by the majority of NFL draft experts and scouts. He was ranked the 13th best offensive tackle prospect in the draft by DraftScout.com and was ranked the 14th best offensive tackle by Scouts Inc.

The Oakland Raiders selected Parker in the third round (65th overall) of the 2018 NFL Draft. Parker was the fifth offensive tackle selected in 2018. The Oakland Raiders traded their third (75th overall), fifth (152nd overall), and seventh round (212th overall) picks to the Baltimore Ravens in exchange for the Ravens' third round pick in order to move up in the third round and draft Parker.

On May 21, 2018, the Oakland Raiders signed Parker to a four-year, $4.09 million contract that includes a signing bonus of $1.05 million. Parker was named the Raiders starting right tackle in Week 5 after a season-ending injury to Donald Penn. Allowed 8.5 Sacks in his rookie year.

In 2019, Parker started three games at right tackle. In 2021, he was named the starting right tackle in Week 5 and started the remainder of the season.

On March 21, 2022, Parker re-signed with the Raiders. On August 28, 2022, Parker was placed on injured reserve.

On March 10, 2023, Parker re-signed with the Raiders.

Personal life
Parker currently is married to Dominique Green, whom he met while attending NC A&T, and together they have a 1-year-old daughter. On November 18, 2017, Parker proposed to Green on the field before kickoff in Parker's final home game against arch rival North Carolina Central.

Parker's father was an All-ACC offensive lineman for the University of North Carolina and his mother a prep basketball star at Carver High School and later playing for North Carolina. Parker's older sister, Jasmine, also attended his NC A&T and was a member of the women's basketball program.

References

External links
 North Carolina A&T Aggies bio
 

1995 births
Living people
People from Kannapolis, North Carolina
Players of American football from North Carolina
American football offensive tackles
North Carolina A&T Aggies football players
Las Vegas Raiders players
Oakland Raiders players